María de Lourdes Maldonado López (11 February 1969– 23 January 2022) was a Mexican journalist.

Life and career 
Maldonado López was born on 11 February 1969 in Gómez Palacio, Durango, and studied economics at the Autonomous University of Baja California. Throughout her career, Maldonado López had worked at several Mexican media outlets including Primer Sistema de Noticias, which is owned by former Baja California Governor Jaime Bonilla.

Maldonado López had been involved in a years-long labor dispute with PSN and Bonilla after suing the company for unfair dismissal and unpaid wages. Maldonado López was asking for more than $20,000 in back pay.

She asked Andrés Manuel López Obrador for protection at a press conference in 2019.

In January 2022, she won a lawsuit. Days later, on 23 January, she was shot and killed in red Hyundai Atos vehicle in front of her home in Tijuana. She was the third of four journalists killed in Mexico in January 2022, in what was reportedly the most violent month for journalists since 2011.

References 

1969 births
2022 deaths
2022 murders in Mexico
21st-century Mexican journalists
Assassinated Mexican journalists
Mexican women journalists
Autonomous University of Baja California alumni
People from Gómez Palacio, Durango
People from Tijuana
Femicide in Mexico
Deaths by firearm in Mexico